Quiet Fire is the third studio album by American singer-songwriter Roberta Flack, released in November 1971 by Atlantic Records. It was recorded at Atlantic Recording Studios, Regent Studios, and The Hit Factory in New York City. The album peaked at number 18 on the Billboard Top LPs & Tape, and its single "Will You Still Love Me Tomorrow" charted at number 76 on the Hot 100.

Critical reception
In a contemporary review for The Village Voice, Robert Christgau gave Quiet Fire a "C", writing that Flack occasionally "sounds kind, intelligent, and very likable, but she often exhibits the gratuitous gentility you'd expect of anyone who said 'between you and I.'" In a retrospective review, The Rolling Stone Album Guide (1992) gave it two out of five stars and claimed it "barely sparks at all". AllMusic's Stephen Cook was more enthusiastic, giving it four-and-a-half out of five stars and calling it "one of Flack's best". He believed its "varied mix all comes off sounding seamless" while writing: "Forgoing the full-throttled delivery of, say, Aretha Franklin, Flack translates the pathos of gospel expression into measured intensity and sighing, elongated phrases."

Track listing

Personnel

Musicians 

 Roberta Flack – piano, vocals
 Joshie Armstead – background vocals
 J.R. "Jim" Bailey – background vocals
 Seymour Barab – cello
 David Carey – vibraphone
 Ron Carter – bass guitar
 The Newark Boys Chorus – background vocals
 Joel Dorn – background vocals
 Joe Farrell – flute, alto saxophone, tenor saxophone
 Corky Hale – harp
 Hilda Harris – background vocals
 Cissy Houston – background vocals
 Ted Hoyle – cello
 Wally Kane – bassoon
 Hubert Laws – flute
 Buddy Lucas – harmonica
 Ralph MacDonald – percussion, congas
 Arif Mardin – background vocals, string arrangements, flute arrangement

 Les McCann – background vocals
 Hugh McCracken – guitar
 Gene McDaniels – background vocals
 Kermit Moore – cello
 Romeo Penque – flute, soprano saxophone
 Terry Plumeri – double bass
 Seldon Powell – tenor saxophone
 Bernard Purdie – drums
 Chuck Rainey – bass, electric bass
 George Ricci – cello
 William Slapin – flute
 Grady Tate – percussion, drums
 Richard Tee – organ
 Tasha Thomas – background vocals
 Sammy Turner – background vocals

Production 
 Rod Bristow – photography
 Deodato – horn arrangements, string arrangements
 Joel Dorn – producer
 William Eaton – horn arrangements, string arrangements
 Ira Friedlander – cover design
 Lewis Hahn – engineer
 Bruce Tergesen – engineer

Charts

References 

1971 albums
Roberta Flack albums
Albums arranged by Arif Mardin
Albums arranged by Eumir Deodato
Albums produced by Joel Dorn
Atlantic Records albums